Kees Oldenburg (28 December 1900 – 20 January 1954) was a Dutch footballer. He played in one match for the Netherlands national football team in 1926.

References

External links
 

1900 births
1954 deaths
Dutch footballers
Netherlands international footballers
Association footballers not categorized by position